Bettina Pousttchi (born 1971) is a German artist. She currently lives in Berlin. She has worked in photography, sculpture, video and site-specific installation.

Life 

In 1990-1992, she studied fine art at the Université de Paris. Then in 1992-1997, studied philosophy, art history and film theory at the Universities of Cologne and Bochum. From 1999-2000, she followed the Independent Studio Program of the Whitney Museum of American Art in New York. She had work in the Venice Biennale in 2003 and again in 2009.

Work

In 2016–2017 her photographic series World Time Clock was shown at the Hirshhorn Museum and Sculpture Garden; it consisted of twenty-four photographs of clock-faces, one from each of the major time zones of the world, and all taken at five minutes to two.

Façades in public space 
Since 2009, Bettina Pousttchi has been realizing photographic interventions on public buildings, which are related to the urban and historic context of each particular place. Her monumental photo installation Echo on Schlossplatz in Berlin covered the entire exterior façade of the Temporäre Kunsthalle for half a year. Extending nearly 2,000 square meters, the installation consisted of 970 different paper posters, and formed a continuous motif that recalled the Palast der Republik (Palace of the Republic), the building which had just been demolished on that very site.

In 2014, the artist transformed the Nasher Sculpture Center Dallas into a Drive-Thru Museum, referencing the site's history and the architecture of the Renzo Piano building. Her up to now largest photo installation to this point is The City (2014), which covered three sides of the Wolfsburg castle with a 2,150 square meter photographic print. The photomontage shows ten skyscrapers that have been the world's highest buildings, grouping them together into an imaginary single transnational skyline.

On the occasion of her survey exhibition In Recent Years 2019-2020 at Berlinische Galerie, she transformed the entire glass facade of the museum with the photo installation Berlin Window.

Konzerthaus Berlin commissioned the artist 2021 on the occasion of their bicentennial with the work, Amplifier transforming the historical building by Karl Friedrich Schinkel on Gendarmenmarkt.

Sculptures 
Pousttchi’s sculptural works often use street furniture like street bollards, crowd barriers or bike racks as a starting point. She transforms these everyday objects into new sculptural compositions of various colors and surfaces. Her most recent sculptures Vertical Highways are transformations of crash barriers. The vertical alignment and modular use of a prefabricated element change the viewer’s spatial perception and give the work an architectural reference. Three of these sculptures were presented at the Tuileries Garden in Paris in October 2021, as part of the outdoor exhibition Hors les Murs in front of the Musée du Louvre.

Collections 
Examples of her work are held in various public collections, among them the Hirshhorn Museum and Sculpture Garden and the Phillips Collection in Washington, D.C., the Arts Club of Chicago, the Nasher Sculpture Center in Dallas, Texas, the Berlinische Galerie in Berlin, the Albertina in Vienna, the Von-der-Heydt Museum in Wuppertal, the Kunsthalle Bielefeld, as well as in the collection of the Federal Republic of Germany. Another public collections of her work will be on Nasher Sculpture Center for everyone to look at.

Grants and Awards 
2016: Villa Aurora, Los Angeles  

2014: Wolfsburg Art Prize, Junge Stadt sieht Junge Kunst  

2008: TrAIN, Research Center for Transnational Art, Identity and Nation, University of the Arts, London  

2007: BBAX - Berlin Buenos Aires Art Exchange  

2005: Provinzial Förderprojekt  

2000: Kunststiftung NRW

Exhibitions 

 Museum Morsbroich, Leverkusen (2001)
 Württembergischer Kunstverein Stuttgart (2003)
 Von der Heydt Museum, Wuppertal (2007)
  (2009/2010)
 Kunsthalle Basel (2011)
 Schirn Kunsthalle Frankfurt (2012)
  (2014)
 Nasher Sculpture Center, Dallas, Texas (2014)
 The Phillips Collection, Washington D.C. (2016)
 Hirshhorn Museum and Sculpture Garden, Washington D.C (2016/2017)
 The Arts Club of Chicago (2017)
  (with Daniel Buren) (2017)
 Kunstmuseum St. Gallen (2018)
 Neues Museum Nürnberg (2018)
 Kunsthalle Tübingen (2019/2020)
 KINDL – Centre of Contemporary Art Berlin (2019/2020)
 Berlinische Galerie, Berlin (2019/2020)
 Konzerthaus Berlin (2021)
 Arp Museum, Remagen (2021/2022)
 Bundeskunsthalle, Bonn (2022)

References

1971 births
Living people
21st-century German women artists
Kunstakademie Düsseldorf alumni
Artists from Mainz
German contemporary artists